Silao railway station is a small railway station in Nalanda district, Bihar. Its code is SILO. It serves Silao town. The station consists of one platform.

Trains 

 Daniyawan–Fatuha Passenger (unreserved)	
 Shramjeevi Superfast Express

References

External links

Railway stations in Nalanda district
Danapur railway division